Raai is a given name and surname. Notable people with the name include:

Raai Laxmi (born 1989), Indian film actress and model
Seba Al-Raai (born 1982), road cyclist from Syria

See also
Rai (disambiguation)